Hermes Aristóteles Romero Espinoza (born 18 October 1995) is a Venezuelan footballer who plays for Erzeni as a midfielder.

Club career 
Aristotle began his career at Carabobo FC. He had a loan stint with Monagas Sport Club, before returning to Carabobo. He then moved to Cabudaren club ACD Lara. In June 2016 he signed on with Mineros de Guayana, becoming a regular in the team from Puerto Ordaz.

On 31 January 2019, he joined Spanish club Rayo Majadahonda on loan until the end of the 2018–19 season.

International career
He was called up to the Venezuela national football team in September 2016. He, however, did not break into the first team for the 2018 FIFA World Cup qualification (CONMEBOL) matches against Brazil and Uruguay.

References

External links

1995 births
Living people
Venezuelan footballers
Asociación Civil Deportivo Lara players
Association football midfielders
Venezuela international footballers
Venezuelan expatriate footballers
F.C. Crotone players
NK Ankaran players
CF Rayo Majadahonda players
FK Partizani Tirana players
Venezuelan expatriate sportspeople in Italy
Venezuelan expatriate sportspeople in Slovenia
Venezuelan expatriate sportspeople in Spain
Venezuelan expatriate sportspeople in Albania
Expatriate footballers in Italy
Expatriate footballers in Slovenia
Expatriate footballers in Spain
Expatriate footballers in Albania
Serie A players
Slovenian PrvaLiga players
Serie B players
Segunda División players
People from Guárico